Debananda Amat (1916-2011) was an Indian politician. He was elected to the Lok Sabha, the lower house of the Parliament of India from Sundargarh, Odisha as a member of the Janata Dal.

References

External links
Official Biographical Sketch in Lok Sabha Website

1916 births
2011 deaths
Lok Sabha members from Odisha
India MPs 1967–1970
India MPs 1977–1979
India MPs 1989–1991
Janata Dal politicians
Janata Party politicians
Rajya Sabha members from Odisha
Swatantra Party politicians